A full metal jacket (FMJ) bullet is a small-arms projectile consisting of a soft core (often lead) encased in an outer shell ("jacket") of harder metal, such as gilding metal, cupronickel, or, less commonly, a steel alloy.  A bullet jacket usually allows higher muzzle velocities than bare lead without depositing significant amounts of metal in the bore. It also prevents damage to bores from hard steel or armor-piercing core materials.

History 

The bullet was invented in 1882 by Swiss Colonel Eduard Rubin while he was working for the Swiss Federal Ammunition Factory and Research Center, which developed ammunition for the Swiss military.

The use of full metal jacketing in military ammunition came about in part because of the need for improved feeding characteristics in small arms that used internal mechanical manipulation of the cartridge in order to chamber rounds as opposed to externally hand-reloading single-shot firearms. The harder metal used in bullet jackets was less prone to deformation than softer exposed lead, which improved feeding. That also allowed bullets to withstand much higher velocities caused by the decrease of the caliber.

It is sometimes thought that military use of FMJ ammunition was the result of The Hague Convention of 1899, Declaration III, prohibiting the use in international warfare of bullets that easily expand or flatten in the body. However, jacketed bullets were adopted by most European militaries during the late 1880s and early 1890s, about a decade prior to the Hague Convention.

Impact characteristics 

By design, fully jacketed projectiles have less capacity to expand after contact with the target than a hollow-point projectile. While this can be an advantage when engaging targets behind cover, it can also be a disadvantage as an FMJ bullet may pierce completely through a target, leading to less severe wounding, and possibly failing to disable the target. Furthermore, a projectile that goes completely through a target can cause unintentional collateral damage behind the target.

See also 
 Soft-point bullet
 Total metal jacket

References

External links 
 
 
 

Bullets